Valeria Fabrizi (born 20 October 1936) is an Italian actress, singer and television personality.

Life and career 
Born in Verona, in 1936 Fabrizi made her acting debut in the revue Campione senza valore. The same year, she had her first leading role in the comedy play Carlo non farlo. In 1957 she entered the Miss Universe competition and appeared in the comedy play L'adorabile Giulio. After having been the soubrette of the 1959 musical Una storia in blue jeans she became the prima donna of the Erminio Macario's stage company. In 1964 Fabrizi married Tata Giacobetti, member of the group Quartetto Cetra, and started appearing in their television works. Fabrizi also has a film career of about thirty films, and she recorded several singles with EMI.

Filmography

Films

Television

References

External links 

 Valeria Fabrizi at Discogs

1936 births
20th-century Italian actresses
Italian film actresses
Italian stage actresses
Italian television actresses
Italian television presenters
Living people
Miss Universe 1957 contestants
Actors from Verona
Italian women television presenters
Mass media people from Verona